Jubilee Garden is a private housing estate situated at 2-18 Lok King Street, Fo Tan, Sha Tin District, New Territories, Hong Kong. It is located near the MTR Fo Tan station and right next to Sha Tin Racecourse.

Overview
There are 9 blocks of residential buildings providing a total of 2,260 units of apartment and duplex condo.

History

Jubilee Garden was built by Cheung Kong Holdings and Kowloon-Canton Railway Corporation during the 1980s and it was the first large-scale property development in Lok King Street, Fo Tan. Jubilee Garden was also the first large-scale residential development by the KCRC. It was built above a podium over the stabling tracks of Ho Tung
Lau maintenance centre of the KCRC.

The construction of the Jubilee Garden apartments was completed in two stages (completion date):
 Stage One - Blocks 4 to 8 (1985)
 Stage Two - Blocks 1 to 3 (1986)
The Ho Tung Lau maintenance centre was later upgraded in three phases between 1989 and 1995. The Royal Ascot, jointly developed by Sun Hung Kai Properties and KCRC, was built above it, and was fully occupied by April 1997.

Resident facilities

Garden podium
Outdoor swimming pool
Tennis courts
Basketball court
Table tennis rooms

Transportation
It is in proximity to the MTR East Rail line (Fo Tan station).

References

External links

Cheung Kong Holdings' introduction
Google Profiles - An Unofficial Site of Jubilee Garden
Facebook Jubilee Garden Community

Fo Tan
Private housing estates in Hong Kong
CK Hutchison Holdings